Lewis is an unincorporated community in Wallowa County, Oregon, United States. It was named by Herbert L. Dunbar for Frank Lewis, whose wife, Alta E. Lewis, was the first postmaster of the community's post office, which operated from September 11, 1913 to May 1935.

Climate
The climate in this area has mild differences between highs and lows, and there is adequate rainfall year-round.  According to the Köppen Climate Classification system, Lewis has a marine west coast climate, abbreviated "Cfb" on climate maps.

References

Unincorporated communities in Wallowa County, Oregon
1913 establishments in Oregon
Unincorporated communities in Oregon